The City of Liverpool College is one of three colleges of further education in Liverpool, Merseyside. It was established in 1992 by the amalgamation of all four further education colleges within Liverpool.

The college is located over several sites across the city centre. Community-based provision has been disestablished in response to reduction in funding provision by central government. ESOL (English for Speakers of Other Languages) courses are likely to be the sole community-based provision.

The college left LEA control and was incorporated in 1993 and is overseen by the Corporation Board. The college's first principal was Wally Brown CBE. The board is made up of representatives from local businesses and communities. The college receives its funding from the government via the Skills Funding Agency (SFA).

College Campus
There are four main college centres, all of which are within the City Centre area.

The Arts Centre
The Arts Centre is a provider of arts teaching and learning on Merseyside. Specialist arts and technical facilities, recording studios, dance and drama facilities can be chosen – as well as photography, fashion and multimedia studios. Many students study here, usually more than 2,000.

Creative Apprenticeships are run at this centre along with courses in: 
 Art and Design
 Dance
 Drama
 Musical Theatre
 Events Management
 Fashion
 Graphic Design
 Interactive Design
 Journalism
 Media
 Theatre Technology
 3D Design
 Music
 Music Technology
 Multimedia
 Photography
 ICT and Digital technologies
 
HE programmes in Creative and Digital Arts are also run at the Arts Centre.

Clarence Street
Clarence Street centre was opened in 2001. The following courses can be chosen:

 English and Humanities 
 GCSEs
 A-levels
 Science
 Access to Science/Health
 Business Studies
 Higher Education Courses
 Teacher Education

Duke Street
Opened in 2003, Duke Street offers the following course types:

 Hospitality and Catering 
 Bakery and Confectionery
 Travel, Tourism and Leisure
 Hairdressing and Beauty Therapy
 Holistic and Complementary Therapies
 Makeup Artistry
 English for Speakers of Other Languages
 English as a Foreign Language
 Professional Development

Vauxhall Road
Opened in 2003 at a cost of over £10 million, this centre specialises in construction and engineering. The following course types can be chosen:

 Brickwork
 Plastering
 Joinery
 Building services
 Electrical and gas installation
 Plumbing
 Motor Vehicle Engineering
 Electronic Engineering
 Manufacturing

The Learning Exchange
The £35 million Learning Exchange on Roscoe Street is central to the College's city centre campus and houses all its student support services, including finance, exams and careers advice and guidance.

The Learning Exchange is the location for courses in health care and child studies and Sport, Exercise & Fitness - including Uniformed Services.  It is also home to HE programmes in computing and business with accounting.

Qualifications available
The college offers traditional academic qualifications such as GCSEs and A-levels, as well as vocational courses at national certificate, diploma and higher national level.  It also offers programmes at foundation and master's degree level.

The college also provides a range of professional qualifications such as Microsoft Systems Administrator, Microsoft Office Specialist and CISCO CCNA. Students studying these areas may have chose these as a way to enhance their prior knowledge.

See also
 Liverpool Knowledge Quarter

References

External links
The City Of Liverpool College
A to Z of Unis and Colleges from "The Independent"
Ofsted report for The City of Liverpool College (2005)
Other OFSTED reports

Education in Liverpool
Further education colleges in Merseyside
Learning and Skills Beacons
Educational institutions established in 1992
1992 establishments in England